The Andhra Pradesh Prohibition and Excise Department is the law enforcement agency for excise in the Indian state of Andhra Pradesh.The Department enforces laws related to liquor, narcotics, psychotropics and Medicines that contain alcohol and narcotics.

Duties
The agency's duties are to:

Ensure that the Excise Revenue is protected and collected according to the acts and rules. 
Prevent illegal production of liquor and its trafficking.
Prevent the trafficking of Narcotic Drugs.
Campaign against Alcoholism.

Revenue
The Excise Revenue is the second largest source for the State Government.

References

State agencies of Andhra Pradesh
State taxation in India
Year of establishment missing